Day to Day Dust was an album by Canadian singer-songwriter Murray McLauchlan, released in 1973.

Track listing
All songs by Murray McLauchlan.
 "Hurricane of Change" – 3:06 
 "Revelations" – 4:44 
 "Linda, Won't You Take Me In" – 2:57 
 "The Fool Who'd Watch You Go" – 4:53 
 "Two Bit Nobody" – 3:38 
 "Six For Five" – 3:41 
 "You Need a New Lover Now" – 3:39 
 "Golden Trumpet" – 4:40 
 "Paradise" – 5:38 
 "Midnight Break" – 5:11

Personnel
Murray McLauchlan – vocals, guitar, harmonica, keyboards
Amos Garrett – guitar
Chris Parker – drums
Dennis Pendrith – bass
Chris Skene – backing vocals
Bernie Finkelstein – backing vocals
Technical
Bill Seddon - mixing
Bart Schoales - art direction, photography

References

1973 albums
Murray McLauchlan albums
True North Records albums